Ellendale may refer to:

United States
 Ellendale, Delaware
 Ellendale, Minnesota
 Ellendale, North Carolina
 Ellendale, North Dakota
 Ellendale, Oregon
 Ellendale, Tennessee

Australia
 Ellendale, Tasmania
 Alternative name for the Day Cottage